The 2016 Missouri gubernatorial election was held on November 8, 2016, to elect the Governor of Missouri, concurrently with the 2016 U.S. presidential election, as well as elections to the United States Senate and elections to the United States House of Representatives and various state and local elections.

The primaries were held on August 2. Incumbent Democratic Governor Jay Nixon was term-limited and could not run for re-election to a third term in office. State Attorney General Chris Koster and businessman, author and former U.S. Navy SEAL Eric Greitens won the Democratic and Republican primaries, respectively. On election day, November 8, 2016, the Associated Press declared Greitens the winner of the election, and Koster conceded shortly after.

Democratic primary

Candidates

Declared
 Chris Koster, Attorney General of Missouri
 Eric Morrison, pastor, community leader 
 Leonard Steinman, perennial candidate
 Charles Wheeler, former mayor of Kansas City and former state senator

Declined
 Claire McCaskill, U.S. Senator, former state auditor of Missouri and nominee for governor in 2004
 Clint Zweifel, State Treasurer of Missouri
 Joe Maxwell, former lieutenant governor of Missouri

Endorsements

Polling

Results

Republican primary

Candidates

Declared
 John Brunner, businessman and candidate for the U.S. Senate in 2012
 Eric Greitens, businessman, author and former U.S. Navy SEAL
 Catherine Hanaway, former Speaker of the Missouri House of Representatives and former United States Attorney for the Eastern District of Missouri
 Peter Kinder, Lieutenant Governor of Missouri

Former
 Tom Schweich, State Auditor of Missouri (died February 26, 2015)

Withdrew
 Randy Asbury, former state representative
 Bob Dixon, state senator
 Mike Parson, state senator (running for Lieutenant Governor)

Declined
 Tim Jones, Speaker of the Missouri House of Representatives
 Bart Korman, state representative
 Blaine Luetkemeyer, U.S. Representative
 Ron Richard, state senator and former Speaker of the Missouri House of Representatives
 Dave Spence, businessman and nominee for governor in 2012
 Jim Talent, former U.S. Senator

Endorsements

Polling

Results

Third party and independent candidates

Green Party

Candidates

Declared
Don Fitz

Independent

Candidates

Declared
Les Turilli, Jr., businessman

Libertarian Party

Candidates

Declared
Cisse W. Spragins, candidate for the U.S. Senate in 2010 and nominee for Missouri Secretary of State in 2012

Results

General election

Debates
Complete video of debate, September 30, 2016 - C-SPAN

Predictions

Polling 
Aggregate polls

with John Brunner

with Catherine Hanaway

with Peter Kinder

with Bob Dixon

with Bart Korman

with Tom Schweich

with Randy Asbury

with Claire McCaskill

Results

Campaign finance investigations
On April 28, 2017, the Missouri Ethics Commission fined Greitens' campaign $1,000 for violating state campaign ethics rules regarding campaign disclosure. Greitens did not contest the fine.

In 2018, Missouri Attorney General Josh Hawley announced the opening of an investigation of Greitens' 2016 campaign financing.

On June 1, 2018, Eric Greitens resigned from office, leaving Mike Parson, his lieutenant governor, to succeed him.

Notes

References

External links
Official campaign websites (Archived)
Chris Koster (D) for Governor
Eric Greitens (R) for Governor
Les Turilli, Jr. (I) for Governor

Missouri
Governor
2016